Ballymacarrett or Ballymacarret is the name of both a townland and electoral ward in Belfast. The townland is in County Down and the electoral ward is part of the Titanic district electoral area of Belfast City Council.

The ward was created in 1973 with most of the population coming from the former Pottinger ward. The ward was slightly enlarged in 1985, taking in part of the Island ward.

The ward consists of two distinct districts : Ballymacarrett itself, which is almost entirely Protestant, and the Short Strand which is almost entirely Catholic, with the two separated by a peaceline. Consequently, in the 2001 census, the Roman Catholic community background figure was 51%.

Set in the shadows of the Harland and Wolff cranes Samson & Goliath, large numbers of local men worked in the shipyard during its heyday. The area is also well known for 'Ulster's Freedom Corner', a series of loyalist murals.

History

The Troubles
In some ways the ward has been a microcosm of the Northern Ireland troubles. The June 1970 "Battle of Saint Matthew's" occupies an important place in Irish republican history after a gun battle between republicans and loyalists, who were accused of attacking the church. Loyalists counter this with claims that three Orange Order members were killed after returning from a parade. The Historical Enquiries Team (HET) confirmed the loyalist version of events. It is seen as one of the key developments in the rise to prominence of the Provisional IRA. Similarly on the Ballymacarrett side of the peaceline, Protestant residents have claimed that Republicans are engaged in attacks on Protestant homes which amount to 'ethnic cleansing' – claims which Republicans dispute and deny.

2011 East Belfast riots
Ballymacarrett and the nearby Newtownards Road played a key part in what became known as the 2011 Northern Ireland riots. At first, the riots were only located in the area and were known as the 2011 East Belfast riots but by July, the riots had spread to other parts of the country. During the riots, the Protestants in the area were going against Short Strand Catholics.

Transport
Ballymacarrett was the location of the Ballymacarrett Junction, a large railway junction that served the Belfast and County Down Railway from its Queens Quay terminus, to Bangor in the north, and the mainline running south to Comber, Downpatrick and Newcastle. There was also an interconnection over the river Lagan to the Great Northern Railway and on to Belfast Central railway station.

Ballymacarrett was the scene of the Ballymacarrett rail crash which occurred at 7.50am on 10 January 1945 when the 7.40am rail motor Holywood to Belfast crashed into the rear of the 7.10am Bangor to Belfast train. 22 passengers were killed, and 27 injured. The darkness and local fog were a factor but the driver of the rail motor was held to blame.

Ballymacarrett Halt railway station was located on the B&CDR route from Belfast to Bangor. It opened on 1 May 1905, but closed on 9 May 1977, when the adjacent Bridge End railway station opened.

References

Electoral wards of Belfast
Townlands of County Down
Civil parish of Knockbreda